Bangladesh, officially the People's Republic of Bangladesh, is an independent, secular and democratic country in South Asia. It is the world's fifth largest democracy, having the eighth largest population in the world. To the west, north and east, Bangladesh shares land borders with India and with Myanmar to the southeast. In the south, Bangladesh has the world's longest natural sandy beach in Cox's Bazar and the world's largest mangrove forest (Sundarbans) along the coastline forming the northern part of the Bay of Bengal at the apex of the Indian Ocean. It is narrowly separated from Bhutan and Nepal by the Siliguri Corridor and from China by the Indian state of Sikkim in the north. Bangladesh is a parliamentary democracy, where the Prime Minister is the Head of State and the President is a ceremonial figure. General elections are held routinely every five years to elect three hundred Members of Parliament and the party that wins the largest number of seats in parliament forms the government. Dhaka, the capital and the largest city, is the nation's political, financial and cultural centre. Chittagong is the second-largest city and Chittagong Port is one of the busiest ports in the Bay of Bengal together with Mongla Port, Payra Port and Matarbari Port. The official language is Bengali, one of the easternmost branches of the Indo-European language family.

Bangladesh forms the sovereign part of the historic and ethnolinguistic region of Bengal, which was divided during the Partition of India in 1947. The country has a Bengali Muslim majority. Ancient Bengal was an important cultural centre in the Indian subcontinent as the home of the states of Vanga, Pundra, Gangaridai, Gauda, Samatata, and Harikela. The Mauryan, Gupta, Pala, Sena, Chandra and Deva dynasties were the last pre-Islamic rulers of Bengal. The Muslim conquest of Bengal began in 1204 when Bakhtiar Khalji overran northern Bengal and invaded Tibet. Becoming part of the Delhi Sultanate, three city-states emerged in the 14th century with much of eastern Bengal being ruled from Sonargaon. Sufi missionary leaders like Sultan Balkhi, Shah Jalal and Shah Makhdum Rupos helped in spreading Muslim rule. The region was unified into an independent, unitary Bengal Sultanate. Under Mughal rule, eastern Bengal continued to prosper as the melting pot of Muslims in the eastern subcontinent and attracted traders from around the world. The Bengali elite were among the richest people in the world due to strong trade networks like the muslin trade which supplied textiles, such as 40% of Dutch imports from Asia. Mughal Bengal became increasingly assertive and independent under the Nawabs of Bengal in the 18th century. In 1757, the betrayal of Mir Jafar resulted in the defeat of Nawab Siraj-ud-Daulah to the British East India Company and eventual British dominance across South Asia. The Bengal Presidency grew into the largest administrative unit in British India. The creation of Eastern Bengal and Assam in 1905 set a precedent for the emergence of Bangladesh. In 1940, the first Prime Minister of Bengal supported the Lahore Resolution with the hope of creating a state in the eastern subcontinent. Prior to the partition of Bengal, the Prime Minister of Bengal proposed a Bengali sovereign state. A referendum and the announcement of the Radcliffe Line established the present-day territorial boundary of Bangladesh.

In 1947, East Bengal became the most populous province in the Dominion of Pakistan. It was renamed as East Pakistan with Dhaka becoming the country's legislative capital. The Bengali Language Movement in 1952; the East Bengali legislative election, 1954; the 1958 Pakistani coup d'état; the Six point movement of 1966; and the 1970 Pakistani general election resulted in the rise of Bengali nationalism and pro-democracy movements in East Pakistan. The refusal of the Pakistani military junta to transfer power to the Awami League led by Sheikh Mujibur Rahman led to the Bangladesh Liberation War in 1971, in which the Mukti Bahini aided by India waged a successful armed revolution. The conflict saw the 1971 Bangladesh genocide and the massacre of pro-independence Bengali civilians, including intellectuals. The new state of Bangladesh became the first constitutionally secular state in South Asia in 1972. Islam was declared the state religion in 1988. In 2010, the Bangladesh Supreme Court reaffirmed secular principles in the constitution.

A middle power in the Indo-Pacific, Bangladesh is the second largest economy in South Asia. It maintains the third-largest military in the region and is a major contributor to UN peacekeeping operations. The large Muslim population of Bangladesh makes it the third-largest Muslim-majority country. Bangladesh is a parliamentary democracy and a constitutional republic based on the Westminster system. Bengalis make up 99% of the total population of Bangladesh. The country consists of eight divisions, 64 districts and 495 subdistricts. It hosts one of the largest refugee populations in the world due to the Rohingya genocide. Bangladesh faces many challenges, particularly from the effects of climate change and the Rohingya Refugee Crisis. Bangladesh has been a leader within the Climate Vulnerable Forum and also hosts the headquarters of Bay of Bengal Initiative for Multi-Sectoral Technical and Economic Cooperation (BIMSTEC). It is a founding member of SAARC, as well as a member of the Organisation of Islamic Cooperation and the Commonwealth of Nations.

Etymology

The etymology of Bangladesh ("Bengali Country") can be traced to the early 20th century, when Bengali patriotic songs, such as Namo Namo Namo Bangladesh Momo by Kazi Nazrul Islam and Aaji Bangladesher Hridoy by Rabindranath Tagore, used the term. The term Bangladesh was often written as two words, Bangla Desh, in the past. Starting in the 1950s, Bengali nationalists used the term in political rallies in East Pakistan. The term Bangla is a major name for both the Bengal region and the Bengali language. The origins of the term Bangla are unclear, with theories pointing to a Bronze Age proto-Dravidian tribe, the Austric word "Bonga" (Sun god), and the Iron Age Vanga Kingdom. The earliest known usage of the term is the Nesari plate in 805 AD. The term Vangaladesa is found in 11th-century South Indian records. The term gained official status during the Sultanate of Bengal in the 14th century. Shamsuddin Ilyas Shah proclaimed himself as the first "Shah of Bangala" in 1342. The word Bangāl became the most common name for the region during the Islamic period. 16th-century historian Abu'l-Fazl ibn Mubarak mentions in his Ain-i-Akbari that the addition of the suffix "al" came from the fact that the ancient rajahs of the land raised mounds of earth 10 feet high and 20 in breadth in lowlands at the foot of the hills which were called "al". This is also mentioned in Ghulam Husain Salim's Riyaz-us-Salatin. The Indo-Aryan suffix Desh is derived from the Sanskrit word deśha, which means "land" or "country". Hence, the name Bangladesh means "Land of Bengal" or "Country of Bengal".

History

Ancient Bengal

Stone Age tools found in Bangladesh indicate human habitation for over 20,000 years, and remnants of Copper Age settlements date back 4,000 years. Ancient Bengal was settled by Austroasiatics, Tibeto-Burmans, Dravidians and Indo-Aryans in consecutive waves of migration. Archaeological evidence confirms that by the second millennium BCE, rice-cultivating communities inhabited the region. By the 11th century people lived in systemically aligned housing, buried their dead, and manufactured copper ornaments and black and red pottery. The Ganges, Brahmaputra and Meghna rivers were natural arteries for communication and transportation, and estuaries on the Bay of Bengal permitted maritime trade. The early Iron Age saw the development of metal weaponry, coinage, agriculture and irrigation. Major urban settlements formed during the late Iron Age, in the mid-first millennium BCE, when the Northern Black Polished Ware culture developed. In 1879, Alexander Cunningham identified Mahasthangarh as the capital of the Pundra Kingdom mentioned in the Rigveda. The oldest inscription in Bangladesh was found in Mahasthangarh and dates from the 3rd century BCE. It is written in the Brahmi script.

Greek and Roman records of the ancient Gangaridai Kingdom, which (according to legend) deterred the invasion of Alexander the Great, are linked to the fort city in Wari-Bateshwar. The site is also identified with the prosperous trading centre of Souanagoura listed on Ptolemy's world map. Roman geographers noted a large seaport in southeastern Bengal, corresponding to the present-day Chittagong region.

Ancient Buddhist and Hindu states which ruled Bangladesh included the Vanga, Samatata and Pundra kingdoms, the Mauryan and Gupta Empires, the Varman dynasty, Shashanka's kingdom, the Khadga and Candra dynasties, the Pala Empire, the Sena dynasty, the Harikela kingdom and the Deva dynasty. These states had well-developed currencies, banking, shipping, architecture, and art, and the ancient universities of Bikrampur and Mainamati hosted scholars and students from other parts of Asia. Gopala I was the first ever elected ruler of the region in 750 AD, during a time of mass turmoil the people of Bengal elected him to restore stability in the region at which he was successful went on to form the Pala dynasty that ruled until 1161 AD during with time Bengal prospered. Xuanzang of China was a noted scholar who resided at the Somapura Mahavihara (the largest monastery in ancient India), and Atisa travelled from Bengal to Tibet to preach Buddhism. The earliest form of the Bengali language emerged during the eighth century. Seafarers in the Bay of Bengal where modern Bangladesh is now located, have also been sailing and trading with Southeast Asia and exported Buddhist and Hindu cultures to the region since the early Christian era.

Islamic Bengal
The early history of Islam in Bengal is divided into two phases. The first phase is the period of maritime trade with Arabia and Persia between the 8th and 12th centuries. The second phase covers centuries of Muslim dynastic rule after the Islamic conquest of Bengal. The writings of Al-Idrisi, Ibn Hawqal, Al-Masudi, Ibn Khordadbeh and Sulaiman record the maritime links between Arabia, Persia and Bengal. Muslim trade with Bengal flourished after the fall of the Sasanian Empire and the Arab takeover of Persian trade routes. Much of this trade occurred with southeastern Bengal in areas east of the Meghna River. There is speculation regarding the presence of a Muslim community in Bangladesh as early as 690 CE; this is based on the discovery of one of South Asia's oldest mosques in northern Bangladesh. Bengal was possibly used as a transit route to China by the earliest Muslims. Abbasid coins have been discovered in the archaeological ruins of Paharpur and Mainamati. A collection of Sasanian, Umayyad and Abbasid coins are preserved in the Bangladesh National Museum.

Sultanate period

The Muslim conquest of Bengal began with the 1204 Ghurid expeditions led by Muhammad bin Bakhtiyar Khalji, who overran the Sena capital in Gauda and led the first Muslim army into Tibet. Bengal was ruled by the Sultans of the Delhi Sultanate for a century under the Mamluk, Balban, and Tughluq dynasties. In the 14th century, three city-states emerged in Bengal, including Sonargaon led by Fakhruddin Mubarak Shah, Satgaon led by Shamsuddin Ilyas Shah and Lakhnauti led by Alauddin Ali Shah. These city-states were led by former governors who declared independence from Delhi. In 1352, Shamsuddin Ilyas Shah united the three city-states into a single, unitary and independent Bengal Sultanate. The new Sultan of Bengal led the first Muslim army into Nepal and forced the Sultan of Delhi to retreat during an invasion. The army of Ilyas Shah reached as far as Varanasi in the northwest, Kathmandu in the north, Kamarupa in the east and Orissa in the south. During the reign of Sikandar Shah, Delhi recognised Bengal's independence. The Bengal Sultanate established a network of mint towns which acted as a provincial capitals where the Sultan's currency was minted. As Bengal became the easternmost frontier of the Islamic world, the Bengali language crystallized as an official court language during the Bengal Sultanate, giving rise to various prominent writers. The sultanate was evolving as a commercialized and monetized economy, and as a melting pot of Muslim political, mercantile and military elites.

The two most prominent dynasties of the Bengal Sultanate were the Ilyas Shahi and Hussain Shahi dynasties. The reign of Sultan Ghiyasuddin Azam Shah saw the opening of diplomatic relations with Ming China. The reign of the Sultan Jalaluddin Muhammad Shah saw the development of Bengali architecture. During the early 15th century, Bengal aided the Restoration of Min Saw Mon in Arakan, which led to the latter becoming a tributary state of Bengal. During the reign of Sultan Alauddin Hussain Shah, Bengali forces penetrated deep into the Brahmaputra Valley—and being led by Shah Ismail Ghazi, conquered Assam, Jajnagar in Orissa, the Jaunpur Sultanate, Pratapgarh Kingdom and the island of Chandradwip. By 1500, Gaur became the fifth-most populous city in the world with a population of 200,000. Maritime trade linked Bengal with China, Malacca, Sumatra, Brunei, Portuguese India, East Africa, Arabia, Persia, Mesopotamia, Yemen and the Maldives. Bengali ships were among the biggest vessels plying the Bay of Bengal, Indian Ocean and Pacific Ocean. The Sultans permitted the opening of the Portuguese settlement in Chittagong. The disintegration of the Bengal Sultanate began with the intervention of the Suri Empire. Babur began invading Bengal after creating the Mughal Empire. The Bengal Sultanate collapsed with the overthrow of the Karrani dynasty during the reign of Akbar. However, the Bhati region of eastern Bengal continued to be ruled by aristocrats of the former Bengal Sultanate led by Isa Khan. They formed an independent federation called the Twelve Bhuiyans, with their capital in Sonargaon. In 1580, English traveler Ralph Fitch visited Bengal and saw the success of the Twelve Bhuiyans in withstanding against the Mughals. Fitch wrote that "for here are so many Rivers and Lands, that they (Mughals) flee from one to another, whereby his (Akbar) horsemen cannot prevail against them. Great store of cotton cloth is made here. Sinnergan (Sonargaon) is a [town six] leagues from Serrepore, where there is the best and finest cloth made of cotton that is in all India. The chief king of all these countries is called Isacan (Isa Khan), and he is chief of all the other kings". The Bhuiyans ultimately succumbed to the Mughals after Musa Khan was defeated.

Mughal period

The Mughal Empire controlled Bengal by the 17th century. During the reign of Emperor Akbar, the Bengali agrarian calendar was reformed to facilitate tax collection. The Mughals established Dhaka as a fort city and commercial metropolis, and it was the capital of Bengal Subah for 75 years. In 1666, the Mughals expelled the Arakanese from Chittagong. Mughal Bengal attracted foreign traders for its muslin and silk goods, and the Armenians were a notable merchant community. A Portuguese settlement in Chittagong flourished in the southeast, and a Dutch settlement in Rajshahi existed in the north. Bengal accounted for 40% of overall Dutch imports from Asia; including more than 50% of textiles and around 80% of silks. The Bengal Subah, described as the Paradise of the Nations, was the empire's wealthiest province, and a major global exporter, a notable centre of worldwide industries such as muslin, cotton textiles, silk, and shipbuilding. Its citizens also enjoyed one of the world's most superior living standards.

During the 18th century, the Nawabs of Bengal became the region's de facto rulers, with a realm encompassing much of eastern South Asia. The Nawabs forged alliances with European colonial companies, making the region relatively prosperous early in the century. Bengal accounted for 50% of the gross domestic product of the empire. The Bengali economy relied on textile manufacturing, shipbuilding, saltpetre production, craftsmanship, and agricultural produce. Bengal was a major hub for international trade, renowned for its silk and cotton textiles worldwide. Bengal was also famed as a shipbuilding hub.

Eastern Bengal was a thriving melting pot with strong trade and cultural networks. It was a relatively prosperous part of the subcontinent and the center of the Muslim population in the eastern subcontinent. The Bengali Muslim population was a product of conversion and religious evolution, and their pre-Islamic beliefs included elements of Buddhism and Hinduism. The construction of mosques, Islamic academies (madrasas) and Sufi monasteries (khanqahs) facilitated conversion, and Islamic cosmology played a significant role in developing Bengali Muslim society. Scholars have theorised that Bengalis were attracted to Islam by its egalitarian social order, which contrasted with the Hindu caste system. By the 15th century, Muslim poets were widely writing in the Bengali language. Syncretic cults, such as the Baul movement, emerged on the fringes of Bengali Muslim society. The Persianate culture was significant in Bengal, where cities like Sonargaon became the easternmost centres of Persian influence.

In 1756, nawab Siraj ud-Daulah sought to rein in the rising power of the British East India Company by revoking their free trade rights and demanding the dismantling of their fortification in Calcutta. A military conflict ensued which culminated in the Battle of Plassey on 22 June 1757. Robert Clive exploited rivalries within the nawab's family, bribing Mir Jafar, the nawab's uncle and commander in chief, to ensure Siraj-ud-Daula's defeat. Clive rewarded Mir Jafar by making him nawab in place of Siraj-ud-Daula, but henceforth the position was a figurehead appointed and controlled by the company. After Plassey, the Mughal emperor ruled Bengal in name only. Effective power rested with the company. Historians often describe the battle as "the beginning of British colonial rule in South Asia". 

The Company replaced Mir Jafar with his son-in-law, Mir Kasim, in 1760. Mir Kasim challenged British control by allying with Mughal emperor Shah Alam II and the Nawab of Awadh, Shuja ud-Daulah, but the company decisively defeated the three at the Battle of Buxar on 23 October 1764. The resulting treaty made the Mughal emperor a puppet of the British and gave the company the right to collect taxes (diwani) in Bengal, Bihar, and Orissa, giving them de facto control of the region. The Company used Bengal's tax revenue to conquer the rest of India.

Colonial period

Two decades after Vasco Da Gama's landing in Calicut, the Bengal Sultanate permitted the Portuguese settlement in Chittagong to be established in 1528. It became the first European colonial enclave in Bengal. The Bengal Sultanate lost control of Chittagong in 1531 after Arakan declared independence and the established Kingdom of Mrauk U.

Portuguese ships from Goa and Malacca began frequenting the port city in the 16th century. The cartaz system was introduced and required all ships in the area to purchase naval trading licenses from the Portuguese settlement. Slave trade and piracy flourished. The nearby island of Sandwip was conquered in 1602. In 1615, the Portuguese Navy defeated a joint Dutch East India Company and Arakanese fleet near the coast of Chittagong.

The Bengal Sultan after 1534 allowed the Portuguese to create several settlements at Chitagoong, Satgaon, Hughli, Bandel, and Dhaka. In 1535, the Portuguese allied with the Bengal sultan and held the Teliagarhi pass  from Patna helping to avoid the invasion by the Mughals. By then several of the products came from Patna and the Portuguese send in traders, establishing a factory there since 1580.

By the time the Portuguese assured military help against Sher Shah, the Mughals already had started to conquer the Sultanate of Ghiyasuddin Mahmud.

The region accounted for 40% of Dutch imports outside the European continent. The eastern part of Bengal was globally prominent in industries such as textile manufacturing and shipbuilding, and it was a major exporter of silk and cotton textiles, steel, saltpeter, and agricultural and industrial produce in the world.
In 1666, the Mughal government of Bengal led by viceroy Shaista Khan moved to retake Chittagong from Portuguese and Arakanese control. The Anglo-Mughal War was witnessed in 1686.

After the 1757 Battle of Plassey, Bengal was the first region of the Indian subcontinent conquered by the British East India Company. The company formed the Presidency of Fort William, which administered the region until 1858. A notable aspect of Company rule was the Permanent Settlement, which established the feudal zamindari system; in addition, Company policies led to the deindustrialisation of Bengal's textile industry. The capital amassed by the East India Company in Bengal was invested in the emerging Industrial Revolution in Great Britain, in industries such as textile manufacturing. Economic mismanagement, alongside drought and a smallpox epidemic, directly led to the Great Bengal famine of 1770, which is estimated to have caused the deaths of between 1 million and 10 million people. Several rebellions broke out during the early 19th century (including one led by Titumir), as Company rule had displaced the Muslim ruling class from power. A conservative Islamic cleric, Haji Shariatullah, sought to overthrow the British by propagating Islamic revivalism. Several towns in Bangladesh participated in the Indian Rebellion of 1857 and pledged allegiance to the last Mughal emperor, Bahadur Shah Zafar, who was later exiled to neighbouring Burma.

The challenge posed to company rule by the failed Indian Mutiny led to the creation of the British Indian Empire as a crown colony. The British established several schools, colleges, and a university in Bangladesh. Syed Ahmed Khan and Ram Mohan Roy promoted modern and liberal education in the subcontinent, inspiring the Aligarh movement and the Bengal Renaissance. During the late 19th century, novelists, social reformers and feminists emerged from Muslim Bengali society. Electricity and municipal water systems were introduced in the 1890s; cinemas opened in many towns during the early 20th century. East Bengal's plantation economy was important to the British Empire, particularly its jute and tea. The British established tax-free river ports, such as the Port of Narayanganj, and large seaports like the Port of Chittagong.

Bengal had the highest gross domestic product in British India. Bengal was one of the first regions in Asia to have a railway. The first railway in what is now Bangladesh began operating in 1862. In comparison, Japan saw its first railway in 1872. The main railway companies in the region were the Eastern Bengal Railway and Assam Bengal Railway. Railways competed with waterborne transport to become one of the main mediums of transport.

Supported by the Muslim aristocracy, the British government created the province of Eastern Bengal and Assam in 1905; the new province received increased investment in education, transport, and industry. However, the first partition of Bengal created an uproar in Calcutta and the Indian National Congress. In response to growing Hindu nationalism, the All India Muslim League was formed in Dhaka during the 1906 All India Muhammadan Educational Conference. The British government reorganised the provinces in 1912, reuniting East and West Bengal and making Assam a second province.

The Raj was slow to allow self-rule in the colonial subcontinent. It established the Bengal Legislative Council in 1862, and the council's native Bengali representation increased during the early 20th century. The Bengal Provincial Muslim League was formed in 1913 to advocate civil rights for Bengali Muslims within a constitutional framework. During the 1920s, the league was divided into factions supporting the Khilafat movement and favouring co-operation with the British to achieve self-rule. Segments of the Bengali elite supported Mustafa Kemal Atatürk's secularist forces. In 1929, the All Bengal Tenants Association was formed in the Bengal Legislative Council to counter the influence of the Hindu landed gentry, and the Indian Independence and Pakistan Movements strengthened during the early 20th century. After the Morley-Minto Reforms and the diarchy era in the legislatures of British India, the British government promised limited provincial autonomy in 1935. The Bengal Legislative Assembly, British India's largest legislature, was established in 1937.

Although it won most seats in 1937, the Bengal Congress boycotted the legislature. A. K. Fazlul Huq of the Krishak Praja Party was elected as the first Prime Minister of Bengal. In 1940 Huq supported the Lahore Resolution, which envisaged independent states in the subcontinent's northwestern and eastern Muslim-majority regions. The first Huq ministry, a coalition with the Bengal Provincial Muslim League, lasted until 1941; it was followed by a Huq coalition with the Hindu Mahasabha which lasted until 1943. Huq was succeeded by Khawaja Nazimuddin, who grappled with the effects of the Burma Campaign, the Bengal famine of 1943, which killed up to 3 million people, and the Quit India movement. In 1946, the Bengal Provincial Muslim League won the provincial election, taking 113 of the 250-seat assembly (the largest Muslim League mandate in British India). H. S. Suhrawardy, who made a final futile effort for a United Bengal in 1946, was the last premier of Bengal.

Partition of Bengal (1947)

On 3 June 1947, the Mountbatten Plan outlined the partition of British India. On 20 June, the Bengal Legislative Assembly met to decide on the partition of Bengal. At the preliminary joint meeting, it was decided (120 votes to 90) that if the province remained united, it should join the Constituent Assembly of Pakistan. At a separate meeting of legislators from West Bengal, it was decided (58 votes to 21) that the province should be partitioned and West Bengal should join the Constituent Assembly of India. At another meeting of legislators from East Bengal, it was decided (106 votes to 35) that the province should not be partitioned and (107 votes to 34) that East Bengal should join the Constituent Assembly of Pakistan if Bengal was partitioned. On 6 July, the Sylhet region of Assam voted in a referendum to join East Bengal.
Cyril Radcliffe was tasked with drawing the borders of Pakistan and India, and the Radcliffe Line established the borders of present-day Bangladesh. The Radcliffe Line awarded two-thirds of Bengal as the eastern wing of Pakistan, although the medieval and early modern Bengali capitals of Gaur, Pandua and Murshidabad fell on the Indian side close to the border with Pakistan.

Union with Pakistan

The Dominion of Pakistan was created on 14 August 1947. East Bengal, with Dhaka as its capital, was the most populous province of the 1947 Pakistani federation (led by Governor General Muhammad Ali Jinnah, who promised freedom of religion and secular democracy in the new state).

Khawaja Nazimuddin was East Bengal's first chief minister with Frederick Chalmers Bourne its governor. The All Pakistan Awami Muslim League was formed in 1949. In 1950, the East Bengal Legislative Assembly enacted land reform, abolishing the Permanent Settlement and the zamindari system. The 1952 Bengali Language Movement was the first sign of friction between the country's geographically separated wings. The Awami Muslim League was renamed the more-secular Awami League in 1953. The first constituent assembly was dissolved in 1954; this was challenged by its East Bengali speaker, Maulvi Tamizuddin Khan. The United Front coalition swept aside the Muslim League in a landslide victory in the 1954 East Bengali legislative election. The following year, East Bengal was renamed East Pakistan as part of the One Unit programme, and the province became a vital part of the Southeast Asia Treaty Organization.

Pakistan adopted a new constitution in 1956. Three Bengalis were its Prime Minister until 1957: Nazimuddin, Mohammad Ali of Bogra and Suhrawardy. None of the three completed their terms and resigned from office. The Pakistan Army imposed military rule in 1958, and Ayub Khan was the country's strongman for 11 years. Political repression increased after the coup. Khan introduced a new constitution in 1962, replacing Pakistan's parliamentary system with a presidential and gubernatorial system (based on electoral college selection) known as Basic Democracy. In 1962 Dhaka became the seat of the National Assembly of Pakistan, a move seen as appeasing increased Bengali nationalism. The Pakistani government built the controversial Kaptai Dam, displacing the Chakma people from their indigenous homeland in the Chittagong Hill Tracts. During the 1965 presidential election, Fatima Jinnah lost to Ayub Khan despite support from the Combined Opposition alliance (which included the Awami League). The Indo-Pakistani War of 1965 blocked cross-border transport links with neighbouring India in what is described as a second partition. In 1966, Awami League leader Sheikh Mujibur Rahman announced a six-point movement for a federal parliamentary democracy.

According to senior World Bank officials, the Pakistani government practised extensive economic discrimination against East Pakistan: greater government spending on West Pakistan, financial transfers from East to West Pakistan, the use of East Pakistan's foreign-exchange surpluses to finance West Pakistani imports, and refusal by the central government to release funds allocated to East Pakistan because the previous spending had been under budget; though East Pakistan generated 70 percent of Pakistan's export revenue with its jute and tea. Sheikh Mujibur Rahman was arrested for treason in the Agartala Conspiracy Case and was released during the 1969 uprising in East Pakistan which resulted in Ayub Khan's resignation. General Yahya Khan assumed power, reintroducing martial law.

Ethnic and linguistic discrimination was common in Pakistan's civil and military services, in which Bengalis were under-represented. Fifteen percent of Pakistani central-government offices were occupied by East Pakistanis, who formed 10 percent of the military. Cultural discrimination also prevailed, making East Pakistan forge a distinct political identity. Authorities banned Bengali literature and music in state media, including the works of Nobel laureate Rabindranath Tagore. A cyclone devastated the coast of East Pakistan in 1970, killing an estimated 500,000 people, and the central government was criticised for its poor response. After the December 1970 elections, calls for the independence of East Bengal became louder; the Bengali-nationalist Awami League won 167 of 169 East Pakistani seats in the National Assembly. The League claimed the right to form a government and develop a new constitution but was strongly opposed by the Pakistani military and the Pakistan Peoples Party (led by Zulfikar Ali Bhutto).

War of Independence

The Bengali population was angered when Prime Minister-elect Sheikh Mujibur Rahman was prevented from taking the office. Civil disobedience erupted across East Pakistan, with calls for independence. Mujib addressed a pro-independence rally of nearly 2 million people in Dacca (as Dhaka used to be spelled in English) on 7 March 1971, where he said, "This time the struggle is for our freedom. This time the struggle is for our independence." The flag of Bangladesh was raised for the first time on 23 March, Pakistan's Republic Day. Later, on 25 March late evening, the Pakistani military junta led by Yahya Khan launched a sustained military assault on East Pakistan under the code name of Operation Searchlight. The Pakistan Army arrested Sheikh Mujibur Rahman and flew him to Karachi. However, before his arrest Mujib proclaimed the Independence of Bangladesh at midnight on 26 March which led the Bangladesh Liberation War to break out within hours. The Pakistan Army and its local supporters continued to massacre Bengalis, in particular students, intellectuals, political figures, and Hindus in the 1971 Bangladesh genocide. The Mukti Bahini, a guerrilla resistance force, also violated human rights during the conflict. During the war, an estimated 0.3 to 3.0 million people were killed and several million people took shelter in neighbouring India.

During the Bangladesh Liberation War, Bengali nationalists declared independence and formed the Mukti Bahini (the Bangladeshi National Liberation Army). The Provisional Government of Bangladesh was established on 17 April 1971, converting the 469 elected members of the Pakistani national assembly and East Pakistani provincial assembly into the Constituent Assembly of Bangladesh. The provisional government issued a proclamation that became the country's interim constitution and declared "equality, human dignity, and social justice" as its fundamental principles. Due to Mujib's detention, Syed Nazrul Islam took over the role of Acting President, while Tajuddin Ahmad was named Bangladesh's first Prime Minister. The Mukti Bahini and other Bengali guerrilla forces formed the Bangladesh Forces, which became the military wing of the provisional government. Led by General M. A. G. Osmani and eleven sector commanders, the forces held the countryside during the war. They conducted wide-ranging guerrilla operations against Pakistani forces. As a result, almost the entire country except for the capital Dacca was liberated by Bangladesh Forces by late November.

This led the Pakistan Army to attack neighbouring India's western front on 2 December 1971. India retaliated in both the western and eastern fronts. With a joint ground advance by Bangladeshi and Indian forces, coupled with air strikes by both India and the small Bangladeshi air contingent, the capital Dacca was liberated from Pakistani occupation in mid-December. During the last phase of the war, both the Soviet Union and the United States dispatched naval forces to the Bay of Bengal in a Cold War standoff. The nine month long war ended with the surrender of Pakistani armed forces to the Bangladesh-India Allied Forces on 16 December 1971. Under international pressure, Pakistan released Rahman from imprisonment on 8 January 1972 and he was flown by the British Royal Air Force to a million-strong homecoming in Dacca. Remaining Indian troops were withdrawn by 12 March 1972, three months after the war ended.

The cause of Bangladeshi self-determination was recognised around the world. By August 1972, the new state was recognised by 86 countries. Pakistan recognised Bangladesh in 1974 after pressure from most of the Muslim countries.

Modern Bangladesh

First parliamentary era

The constituent assembly adopted the constitution of Bangladesh on 4 November 1972, establishing a secular, multiparty parliamentary democracy. The new constitution included references to socialism, and Prime Minister Sheikh Mujibur Rahman nationalised major industries in 1972. A major reconstruction and rehabilitation programme was launched. The Awami League won the country's first general election in 1973, securing a large majority in the "Jatiyo Sangshad", the national parliament. Bangladesh joined the Commonwealth of Nations, the UN, the OIC and the Non-Aligned Movement, and Rahman strengthened ties with India. Amid growing agitation by the opposition National Awami Party and Jashod, he became increasingly authoritarian. Rahman amended the constitution, giving himself more emergency powers (including the suspension of fundamental rights). The Bangladesh famine of 1974 also worsened the political situation.

Presidential era (1975–1991)

In January 1975, Sheikh Mujibur Rahman introduced one-party socialist rule under BAKSAL. Rahman banned all newspapers except four state-owned publications and amended the constitution to increase his power. He was assassinated during a coup on 15 August 1975. Martial law was declared, and the presidency passed to the usurper Khondaker Mostaq Ahmad for four months. Ahmad is widely regarded as a traitor by Bangladeshis. Tajuddin Ahmad, the nation's first prime minister, and four other independence leaders were assassinated on 4 November 1975. Chief Justice Abu Sadat Mohammad Sayem was installed as president by the military on 6 November 1975. Bangladesh was governed by a military junta led by the Chief Martial Law Administrator for three years. In 1977, the army chief Ziaur Rahman became president. Rahman reinstated multiparty politics, privatised industries and newspapers, established BEPZA and held the country's second general election in 1979. A semi-presidential system evolved, with the Bangladesh Nationalist Party (BNP) governing until 1982. Rahman was assassinated in 1981 and was succeeded by Vice-president Abdus Sattar. Sattar received 65.5 per cent of the vote in the 1981 presidential election.

After a year in office, Sattar was overthrown in the 1982 Bangladesh coup d'état. Chief Justice A. F. M. Ahsanuddin Chowdhury was installed as president, but army chief Hussain Muhammad Ershad became the country's de facto leader and assumed the presidency in 1983. Ershad lifted martial law in 1986. He governed with four successive prime ministers (Ataur Rahman Khan, Mizanur Rahman Chowdhury, Moudud Ahmed and Kazi Zafar Ahmed) and a parliament dominated by his Jatiyo Party. General elections were held in 1986 and 1988, although the opposition BNP and Awami League boycotted the latter. Ershad pursued administrative decentralisation, dividing the country into 64 districts, and pushed Parliament to make Islam the state religion in 1988. A 1990 mass uprising forced him to resign, and Chief Justice Shahabuddin Ahmed led the country's first caretaker government as part of the transition to parliamentary rule.

Parliamentary era (1991–present)

After the 1991 general election, the twelfth amendment to the constitution restored the parliamentary republic and Begum Khaleda Zia became Bangladesh's first female prime minister. Zia, a former first lady, led a BNP government from 1990 to 1996. In 1991, her finance minister, Saifur Rahman, began a major programme to liberalise the Bangladeshi economy.

In February 1996, a general election was held, which was boycotted by all opposition parties giving a 300 (of 300) seat victory for BNP. This election was deemed illegitimate, so a system of a caretaker government was introduced to oversee the transfer of power and a new election was held in June 1996, overseen by Justice Muhammad Habibur Rahman, the first Chief Adviser of Bangladesh. The Awami League won the seventh general election, marking its leader Sheikh Hasina's first term as Prime Minister. Hasina's first term was highlighted by the Chittagong Hill Tracts Peace Accord and a Ganges water-sharing treaty with India. The second caretaker government, led by Chief Adviser Justice Latifur Rahman, oversaw the 2001 Bangladeshi general election which returned Begum Zia and the BNP to power.

The second Zia administration saw improved economic growth, but political turmoil gripped the country between 2004 and 2006. A radical Islamist militant group, the JMB, carried out a series of terror attacks. The evidence of staging these attacks by these extremist groups have been found in the investigation. Hundreds of suspected members were detained in numerous security operations in 2006, including the two chiefs of the JMB, Shaykh Abdur Rahman and Bangla Bhai, who was executed with other top leaders in March 2007, bringing the militant group to an end.

In 2006, at the end of the term of the BNP administration, there was widespread political unrest related to the handover of power to a caretaker government.  As such, the Bangladeshi military urged President Iajuddin Ahmed to impose a state of emergency and a caretaker government, led by technocrat Fakhruddin Ahmed, was installed. Emergency rule lasted for two years, during which time investigations into members of both Awami League and BNP were conducted, including their leaders Sheikh Hasina and Khaleda Zia. In 2008, the ninth general election saw a return to power for Sheikh Hasina and the Awami League led Grand Alliance in a landslide victory. In 2010, the Supreme Court ruled martial law illegal and affirmed secular principles in the constitution. The following year, the Awami League abolished the caretaker government system.

Citing the lack of caretaker government, the 2014 general election was boycotted by the BNP and other opposition parties, giving the Awami League a decisive victory. The election was controversial with reports of violence and an alleged crackdown on the opposition in the run-up to the election, and 153 seats (of 300) went uncontested in the election. Despite the controversy, Hasina went on to form a government that saw her return for a third term as Prime Minister. Due to strong domestic demand, Bangladesh emerged as one of the fastest-growing economies in the world. However, human rights abuses increased under the Hasina administration, particularly enforced disappearances. Between 2016 and 2017, an estimated 1 million Rohingya refugees took shelter in southeastern Bangladesh amid a military crackdown in neighbouring Rakhine State, Myanmar.

In 2018, the country saw major movements for government quota reforms and road-safety. The 2018 Bangladeshi general election was marred by allegations of widespread vote rigging. The Awami League won 259 out of 300 seats and the main opposition alliance Jatiya Oikya Front secured only 8 seats, with Sheikh Hasina becoming the longest-serving prime minister in Bangladeshi history. Pro-democracy leader Dr. Kamal Hossain called for an annulment of the election result and for a new election to be held in a free and fair manner. The election was also observed by European Union observers.

Geography

Bangladesh is a small, lush country in South Asia, located on the Bay of Bengal. It is surrounded almost entirely by neighbouring India—and shares a small border with Myanmar to its southeast, though it lies very close to Nepal, Bhutan, and China. The country is divided into three regions. Most of the country is dominated by the fertile Ganges Delta, the largest river delta in the world. The northwest and central parts of the country are formed by the Madhupur and the Barind plateaus. The northeast and southeast are home to evergreen hill ranges.

The Ganges delta is formed by the confluence of the Ganges (local name Padma or Pôdda), Brahmaputra (Jamuna or Jomuna), and Meghna rivers and their respective tributaries. The Ganges unites with the Jamuna (main channel of the Brahmaputra) and later joins the Meghna, finally flowing into the Bay of Bengal. Bangladesh is called the "Land of Rivers"; as it is home to over 57 trans-boundary rivers. However, this resolves water issues politically complicated, in most cases, as the country is a lower riparian state to India.

Bangladesh is predominantly rich fertile flat land. The country's haor wetlands are of significance to global environmental science. Previously, either Keokradong or Tazing Dong were considered the highest.

Administrative divisions

Bangladesh is divided into eight administrative divisions, each named after their respective divisional headquarters: Barisal (officially Barishal), Chittagong (officially Chattogram), Dhaka, Khulna, Mymensingh, Rajshahi, Rangpur, and Sylhet.

Divisions are subdivided into districts (zila). There are 64 districts in Bangladesh, each further subdivided into upazila (subdistricts) or thana. The area within each police station, except for those in metropolitan areas, is divided into several unions, with each union consisting of multiple villages. In the metropolitan areas, police stations are divided into wards, further divided into mahallas.

There are no elected officials at the divisional or district levels, and the administration is composed only of government officials. Direct elections are held in each union (or ward) for a chairperson and a number of members. In 1997, a parliamentary act was passed to reserve three seats (out of 12) in every union for female candidates.

Climate

Straddling the Tropic of Cancer, Bangladesh's climate is tropical, with a mild winter from October to March and a hot, humid summer from March to June. A warm and humid monsoon season lasts from June to October and supplies most of the country's rainfall. Natural calamities, such as floods, tropical cyclones, tornadoes, and tidal bores occur almost every year, combined with the effects of deforestation, soil degradation and erosion. The cyclones of 1970 and 1991 were particularly devastating, the latter killing approximately 140,000 people.

In September 1998, Bangladesh saw the most severe flooding in modern history, after which two-thirds of the country went underwater, along with a death toll of 1,000. As a result of various international and national level initiatives in disaster risk reduction, human toll and economic damage from floods and cyclones have come down over the years. The 2007 South Asian floods ravaged areas across the country, leaving five million people displaced, had a death toll around 500.

Bangladesh is recognised to be one of the countries most vulnerable to climate change. Over the course of a century, 508 cyclones have affected the Bay of Bengal region, 17 percent of which are believed to have caused landfall in Bangladesh. Natural hazards that come from increased rainfall, rising sea levels, and tropical cyclones are expected to increase as the climate changes, each seriously affecting agriculture, water and food security, human health, and shelter. It is estimated that by 2050, a 3 feet rise in sea levels will inundate some 20 percent of the land and displace more than 30 million people. To address the sea level rise threat in Bangladesh, the Bangladesh Delta Plan 2100 has been launched.

Biodiversity

Bangladesh is located in the Indomalayan realm, and lies within four terrestrial ecoregions: Lower Gangetic Plains moist deciduous forests, Mizoram–Manipur–Kachin rain forests, Sundarbans freshwater swamp forests, and Sundarbans mangroves. Its ecology includes a long sea coastline, numerous rivers and tributaries, lakes, wetlands, evergreen forests, semi evergreen forests, hill forests, moist deciduous forests, freshwater swamp forests and flat land with tall grass. The Bangladesh Plain is famous for its fertile alluvial soil which supports extensive cultivation. The country is dominated by lush vegetation, with villages often buried in groves of mango, jackfruit, bamboo, betel nut, coconut and date palm. The country has up to 6000 species of plant life, including 5000 flowering plants. Water bodies and wetland systems provide a habitat for many aquatic plants. Water lilies and lotuses grow vividly during the monsoon season. The country has 50 wildlife sanctuaries.

It is divided into three protected sanctuaries–the South, East and West zones. The forest is a UNESCO World Heritage Site. The northeastern Sylhet region is home to haor wetlands, a unique ecosystem. It also includes tropical and subtropical coniferous forests, a freshwater swamp forest, and mixed deciduous forests. The southeastern Chittagong region covers evergreen and semi-evergreen hilly jungles. Central Bangladesh includes the plainland Sal forest running along with the districts of Gazipur, Tangail and Mymensingh. St. Martin's Island is the only coral reef in the country.

Bangladesh has an abundance of wildlife in its forests, marshes, woodlands and hills. The Bengal tiger, clouded leopard, saltwater crocodile, black panther and fishing cat are among the chief predators in the Sundarbans. Northern and eastern Bangladesh is home to the Asian elephant, hoolock gibbon, Asian black bear and oriental pied hornbill. The Chital deer are widely seen in southwestern woodlands. Other animals include the black giant squirrel, capped langur, Bengal fox, sambar deer, jungle cat, king cobra, wild boar, mongooses, pangolins, pythons and water monitors. Bangladesh has one of the largest populations of Irrawaddy dolphins and Ganges dolphins. A 2009 census found 6,000 Irrawaddy dolphins inhabiting the littoral rivers of Bangladesh. The country has numerous species of amphibians (53), reptiles (139), marine reptiles (19) and marine mammals (5). It also has 628 species of birds.

Several animals became extinct in Bangladesh during the last century, including the one-horned and two-horned rhinoceros and common peafowl. The human population is concentrated in urban areas, limiting deforestation to a certain extent. Rapid urban growth has threatened natural habitats. Although many areas are protected under law, some Bangladeshi wildlife is threatened by this growth. The Bangladesh Environment Conservation Act was enacted in 1995. The government has designated several regions as Ecologically Critical Areas, including wetlands, forests, and rivers. The Sundarbans tiger project and the Bangladesh Bear Project are among the key initiatives to strengthen conservation. It ratified the Rio Convention on Biological Diversity on 3 May 1994. , the country was set to revise its National Biodiversity Strategy and Action Plan.

Politics and government

Bangladesh is a de jure representative democracy under its constitution, with a Westminster-style unitary parliamentary republic that has universal suffrage. The head of government is the Prime Minister, who is invited to form a government every five years. The President invites the leader of the largest party in parliament to become Prime Minister of the world's fifth-largest democracy. Bangladesh experienced a two party system between 1990 and 2014, when the Awami League and the Bangladesh Nationalist Party (BNP) alternated in power. During this period, elections were managed by a neutral caretaker government. But the caretaker government was abolished by the Awami League government in 2011.

One of the key aspects of Bangladeshi politics is the "spirit of the liberation war", which refers to the ideals of the liberation movement during the Bangladesh Liberation War. The Proclamation of Independence enunciated the values of "equality, human dignity and social justice". In 1972, the constitution included a bill of rights and declared "nationalism, socialism, democracy and secularity" as the principles of government policy. Socialism was later de-emphasised and neglected by successive governments. Bangladesh has a market-based economy. To many Bangladeshis, especially in the younger generation, the spirit of the liberation war is a vision for a society based on civil liberties, human rights, the rule of law and good governance.
 Legislative: The Jatiya Sangshad (National Parliament) is the unicameral parliament. It has 350 Members of Parliament (MPs), including 300 MPs elected on the first past the post system and 50 MPs appointed to reserved seats for women's empowerment. Article 70 of the Constitution of Bangladesh forbids MPs from voting against their party. However, several laws proposed independently by MPs have been transformed into legislation, including the anti-torture law. The parliament is presided over by the Speaker of the Jatiya Sangsad, who is second in line to the president as per the constitution. There is also a Deputy Speaker. When a president is incapable of performing duties (i.e. due to illness), the Speaker steps in as Acting President and the Deputy Speaker becomes Acting Speaker. A recurring proposal suggests that the Deputy Speaker should be an opposition member.
 Executive: The Government of Bangladesh is overseen by a cabinet headed by the Prime Minister of Bangladesh. The tenure of a parliamentary government is five years. The Bangladesh Civil Service assists the cabinet in running the government. Recruitment for the civil service is based on a public examination. In theory, the civil service should be a meritocracy. But a disputed quota system coupled with politicisation and preference for seniority have allegedly affected the civil service's meritocracy. The President of Bangladesh is the ceremonial head of state whose powers include signing bills passed by parliament into law. The President is elected by the parliament and has a five-year term. Under the constitution, the president acts on the prime minister's advice. The President is the Supreme Commander of the Bangladesh Armed Forces and the chancellor of all universities.
 Judiciary: The Supreme Court of Bangladesh is the highest court of the land, followed by the High Court and Appellate Divisions. The head of the judiciary is the Chief Justice of Bangladesh, who sits on the Supreme Court. The courts have wide latitude in judicial review, and judicial precedent is supported by Article 111 of the constitution. The judiciary includes district and metropolitan courts divided into civil and criminal courts. Due to a shortage of judges, the judiciary has a large backlog. The Bangladesh Judicial Service Commission is responsible for judicial appointments, salaries, and discipline.

Military

The Bangladesh Armed Forces have inherited the institutional framework of the British military and the British Indian Army. It was formed in 1971 from the military regiments of East Pakistan. In 2022, the active personnel strength of the Bangladesh Army was around 250,000, excluding the Air Force and the Navy (24,000). In addition to traditional defence roles, the military has supported civil authorities in disaster relief and provided internal security during periods of political unrest. For many years, Bangladesh has been the world's largest contributor to UN peacekeeping forces. The military budget of Bangladesh accounts for 1.3% of GDP, amounting to US$4.3 billion in 2021.

The Bangladesh Navy, one of the largest in the Bay of Bengal, includes a fleet of frigates, submarines, corvettes and other vessels. The Bangladesh Air Force has a small fleet of multi-role combat aircraft, including the MiG-29 and Chengdu-F7. Most of Bangladesh's military equipment comes from China.  In recent years, Bangladesh and India have increased joint military exercises, high level visits of military leaders, counter-terrorism cooperation and intelligence sharing. Bangladesh is vital to ensuring stability and security in northeast India.

Bangladesh's strategic importance in the eastern subcontinent hinges on its proximity to China, its frontier with Burma, the separation of mainland and northeast India, and its maritime territory in the Bay of Bengal. In 2002, Bangladesh and China signed a Defence Cooperation Agreement (DCA) which the governments of both countries said will "institutionalize the existing accords in defence sector and also to rationalize the existing piecemeal agreements to enhance cooperation in training, maintenance and in some areas of production". The United States has pursued negotiations with Bangladesh on a Status of Forces Agreement, an Acquisition and Cross-Servicing Agreement and a General Security of Military Information Agreement. In 2019, Bangladesh ratified the UN Treaty on the Prohibition of Nuclear Weapons.

Foreign relations

Bangladesh is considered a middle power in global politics. It plays an important role in the geopolitical affairs of the Indo-Pacific, due to its strategic location between South and Southeast Asia. Bangladesh joined the Commonwealth of Nations in 1972 and the United Nations in 1974. It relies on multilateral diplomacy on issues like climate change, nuclear nonproliferation, trade policy and non-traditional security issues. At the WTO, Bangladesh has used the dispute resolution mechanism to settle trade disputes with India and other countries. Bangladesh pioneered the creation of SAARC, which has been the preeminent forum for regional diplomacy among the countries of the Indian subcontinent. It joined the OIC, an intergovernmental organisation of the Muslim world in 1974, and is a founding member of the Developing 8 Countries. In recent years, Bangladesh has focused on promoting regional trade and transport links with support from the World Bank. Dhaka hosts the headquarters of BIMSTEC, an organisation that brings together countries dependent on the Bay of Bengal.

Relations with neighbouring Myanmar have been severely strained since 2016–2017, after over 700,000 Rohingya refugees illegally entered Bangladesh fleeing persecution, ethnic cleansing, genocide, and other atrocities in their native state. The parliament, government, and civil society of Bangladesh have been at the forefront of international criticism against Myanmar for military operations against the Rohingya, and have demanded their right of return to Arakan.

Bangladesh shares an important bilateral and economic relationship with its largest neighbour India, which is often strained by water politics of the Ganges and the Teesta, and the border killings of Bangladeshi civilians. Post-independent Bangladesh has continued to have a problematic relationship with Pakistan, mainly due to its denial of the 1971 Bangladesh genocide. It maintains a warm relationship with China, which is its largest trading partner, and the largest arms supplier. Japan is Bangladesh's largest economic aid provider, and the two maintain a strategic and economic partnership. Political relations with Middle Eastern countries are robust. Bangladesh receives 59% of its remittances from the Middle East, despite poor working conditions affecting over 4 million Bangladeshi workers. Bangladesh plays a major role in global climate diplomacy as a leader of the Climate Vulnerable Forum.

Civil society
Since the colonial period, Bangladesh has had a prominent civil society. There are various special interest groups, including non-governmental organisations, human rights organisations, professional associations, chambers of commerce, employers' associations and trade unions. The National Human Rights Commission of Bangladesh was set up in 2007. Notable human rights organisations and initiatives include the Centre for Law and Mediation, Odhikar, the Alliance for Bangladesh Worker Safety, the Bangladesh Environmental Lawyers Association, the Bangladesh Hindu Buddhist Christian Unity Council and the War Crimes Fact Finding Committee. The world's largest international NGO BRAC is based in Bangladesh. There have been concerns regarding the shrinking space for independent civil society in recent years, with commentators labelling the civil society movement dead under the authoritarianism of the Awami League.

Human rights

Torture is banned by Article 35 (5) of the Constitution of Bangladesh. Despite this constitutional ban, torture is rampantly used by Bangladesh's security forces. Bangladesh joined the Convention against Torture in 1998; but it enacted its first anti-torture law, the Torture and Custodial Death (Prevention) Act, in 2013. The first conviction under this law was announced in 2020. Amnesty International Prisoners of Conscience from Bangladesh have included Saber Hossain Chowdhury and Shahidul Alam. The Digital Security Act of 2018 has greatly reduced freedom of expression in Bangladesh, particularly on the internet. The Digital Security Act has been used to target critics of the government and bureaucracy. Newspaper editorials have been demanding the repeal of the Digital Security Act.

On International Human Rights Day in December 2021, the United States Department of Treasury announced sanctions on commanders of the Rapid Action Battalion for extrajudicial killings, torture and other human rights abuses. Freedom House has criticised the ruling party for human rights abuses, crackdown on opposition, mass media, and civil society through politicized enforcement. Bangladesh is ranked "partly free" in Freedom House's Freedom in the World report, but its press freedom has deteriorated from "free" to "not free" in recent years due to increasing pressure from the authoritarian government. According to the British Economist Intelligence Unit, the country has a hybrid regime: the third of four rankings in its Democracy Index. Bangladesh was ranked 96th among 163 countries in the 2022 Global Peace Index. According to National Human Rights Commission, 70% of alleged human-rights violations are committed by law-enforcement agencies.

LGBT rights are heavily suppressed by both government and society, as homosexuality is outlawed by section 377 of the criminal code (a legacy of the colonial period), and is punishable by a maximum of life imprisonment. However, Bangladesh recognises the third gender and accords limited rights for transgender people. According to the 2016 Global Slavery Index, an estimated 1,531,300 people are enslaved in Bangladesh, or roughly 1% of the population. A number of slaves in Bangladesh are forced to work in the fish and shrimp industries.

Corruption

Like for many developing countries, institutional corruption is a serious concern for Bangladesh. Bangladesh was ranked 146th among 180 countries on Transparency International's 2018 Corruption Perceptions Index. According to a survey conducted by the Bangladesh chapter of TI, in 2015, the level of bribery was equivalent to 3.7 percent of the national budget. Land administration was the sector with the most bribery in 2015, followed by education, police
and water supply. The Anti Corruption Commission was formed in 2004, and it was active during the 2006–08 Bangladeshi political crisis, indicting many leading politicians, bureaucrats and businessmen for graft.

Economy

Bangladesh is the second largest economy in South Asia after India. The country has outpaced India (of which it was a part until 1947) and Pakistan (of which it was a part until 1971) in terms of per capita income. According to the World Bank, "When the newly independent country of Bangladesh was born on December 16, 1971, it was the second poorest country in the world—making the country's transformation over the next 50 years one of the great development stories. Since then, poverty has been cut in half at record speed. Enrolment in primary school is now nearly universal. Hundreds of thousands of women have entered the workforce. Steady progress has been made on maternal and child health. And the country is better buttressed against the destructive forces posed by climate change and natural disasters. Bangladesh's success comprises many moving parts—from investing in human capital to establishing macroeconomic stability. Building on this success, the country is now setting the stage for further economic growth and job creation by ramping up investments in energy, inland connectivity, urban projects, and transport infrastructure, as well as prioritizing climate change adaptation and disaster preparedness on its path toward sustainable growth".

After the partition of India, the region underwent a change in economic geography. In East Pakistan, free market principles were generally accepted. The government promoted industrialization to produce consumer goods as quickly as possible in order to avoid dependence on imports. Certain sectors, like public utilities, fell under state ownership. Demand for jute during the Korean War led to the creation of the Adamjee Jute Mills, which replaced jute mills in Dundee and Calcutta as the largest jute mill in the world. However, by the 1960s, East Pakistan's share of exports fell from 70% to 50% as West Pakistan received the major portion of investments. Economic grievances played a key role in the pro-independence aspirations of East Pakistanis. During the initial five years of independence (1971–1975), newly created Bangladesh followed a socialist economy. In the late 1970s, socialist policies were largely reversed, industrial plants were returned to private owners, and private industry was increasingly promoted. The government set up export processing zones to stimulate the export economy. Between 1991 and 1993, finance minister Saifur Rahman launched further reforms with support from the IMF which liberalized the economy and boosted industrial growth, services, and exports. By the late 1990s and early 2000s, the reform momentum lost steam due to chronic political instability. But the economy continued to grow.

In 2022, Bangladesh had the second largest foreign-exchange reserves in South Asia. The reserves have boosted the government's spending capacity in spite of tax revenues forming only 7.7% of government revenue. A big chunk of investments have gone into the power sector. In 2009, Bangladesh was experiencing daily blackouts several times a day. In 2022, the country achieved 100% electrification. One of the major anti-poverty schemes of the Bangladeshi government is the Ashrayan Project which aims to eradicate homelessness by providing free housing. The poverty rate has gone down from 80% in 1971, to 44.2% in 1991, to 12.9% in 2021. The literacy rate stood at 74.66% in 2022. Bangladesh has a labor force of roughly 70 million, which is the world's seventh-largest; with an unemployment rate of 5.2% . The government is setting up 100 special economic zones to attract foreign direct investment (FDI) and generate 10 million jobs. The Bangladesh Investment Development Authority (BIDA) and the Bangladesh Economic Zones Authority (BEZA) have been established to help investors in setting up factories; and to complement the longstanding Bangladesh Export Processing Zone Authority (BEPZA). The Bangladeshi taka is the national currency. The service sector accounts for about 51.3% of total GDP and employs 39% of the workforce. The industrial sector accounts for 35.1% of GDP and employs 20.4% of the workforce. The agriculture sector makes up 13.6% of the economy but is the biggest employment sector, with 40.6% of the workforce. In agriculture, the country is a major producer of rice, fish, tea, fruits, vegetables, flowers, and jute. Lobsters and shrimps are some of Bangladesh's well known exports.

Private sector
The private sector accounts for 80% of GDP in comparison to the dwindling role of state-owned companies. Bangladesh's economy is dominated by family-owned conglomerates and small and medium-sized businesses. Some of the largest publicly-traded companies in Bangladesh include Beximco, BRAC Bank, BSRM, GPH Ispat, Grameenphone, Summit Group, and Square Pharmaceuticals. Capital markets include the Dhaka Stock Exchange and the Chittagong Stock Exchange. Its telecommunications industry is one of the world's fastest growing, with 171.854 million cellphone subscribers in January 2021. Over 80% of Bangladesh's export earnings come from the garments industry. Other major industries include shipbuilding, pharmaceuticals, steel, ceramics, electronics, and leather goods. Muhammad Aziz Khan became the first person from Bangladesh to be listed as a billionaire by Forbes.

Infrastructure

Since 2009, Bangladesh has embarked on a series of megaprojects. The 6.15 km long Padma Bridge was built at a cost of US$3.86 billion. The bridge was the first self-financed megaproject in the country's history. Other megaprojects include the Dhaka Metro, Karnaphuli Tunnel, Dhaka Elevated Expressway and Chittagong Elevated Expressway; as well as the Bangladesh Delta Plan to mitigate the impact of climate change.

Tourism
The tourism industry is expanding, contributing some 3.02% of total GDP. Bangladesh's international tourism receipts in 2019 amounted to $391 million. The country has three UNESCO World Heritage Sites (the Mosque City, the Paharpur Buddhist Ruins and the Sundarbans) and five tentative-list sites. Activities for tourists include angling, water skiing, river cruising, hiking, rowing, yachting, and sea bathing. The World Travel and Tourism Council (WTTC) reported in 2019 that the travel and tourism industry in Bangladesh directly generated 1,180,500 jobs in 2018 or 1.9% of the country's total employment. According to the same report, Bangladesh experiences around 125,000 international tourist arrivals per year. Domestic spending generated 97.7 percent of direct travel and tourism gross domestic product (GDP) in 2012.

Energy and electricity

Bangladesh is gradually transitioning to a green economy. Currently, it has the largest off-grid solar power programme in the world, benefiting 20 million people. An electric car called the Palki is being developed for production in the country. The government has reduced tariffs for the purchase of electric cars. Biogas is being used to produce organic fertilizer.

Bangladesh continues to have huge untapped reserves of natural gas, particularly in its maritime territory in the Bay of Bengal. The success ratio of finding gas wells in the country stands at 3:5:1, meaning one commercial deposit is found in every three explored zones. The success ratio is well above the global average. A lack of exploration and decreasing proven reserves have forced Bangladesh to import LNG from abroad, despite having substantially untapped gas reserves. Gas shortages were further exasperated by the Russia-Ukraine War.

While government-owned companies in Bangladesh generate nearly half of Bangladesh's electricity, privately-owned companies like the Summit Group and Orion Group are playing an increasingly important role in both generating electricity, and supplying machinery, reactors, and equipment. Bangladesh increased electricity production from 5 gigawatts in 2009 to 25.5 gigawatts in 2022. It plans to produce 50 gigawatts by 2041. U.S. companies like Chevron and General Electric supply around 55% of Bangladesh's domestic natural gas production and are among the largest investors in power projects. 80% of Bangladesh's installed gas-fired power generation capacity comes from turbines manufactured in the United States.

On 4 October 2022, the national grid collapsed and plunged the whole country into a nationwide blackout. The grid resumed operations after eight hours. The government's investigation focused on technical failure, negligence, and possible sabotage. The investigation found that grid capacity has not kept up with the expansion of electricity generation and the opening of new power plants. Gas shortages were also to blame, including the lack of new gas sources and insufficient gas pipeline infrastructure. There was a shortage of natural gas because of the 2021–present global energy crisis as 77 natural gas power plants had insufficient fuel to meet demand. The electricity sector in Bangladesh is heavily reliant on natural gas. Gas shortages forced the government to import LNG from abroad. As a result, Texas-based Excelerate Energy opened Bangladesh's first floating LNG terminal in 2018 off the coast of Maheshkhali Island. The Summit LNG Terminal was opened in 2019. The Government of Bangladesh has subsidized LNG imports worth several billion dollars. Since October 2021, Bangladesh imported LNG for US$30-37 per million Btu which is 10 times the price it paid in May 2020.
The government stopped buying spot price LNG in June 2022. The country's forex reserves declined due to surging fuel imports. Bangladesh imported 30% of its LNG on the spot price market in 2022, down from 40% in 2021. Bangladesh continues to trade in LNG on the futures exchange markets.

Demographics

According to the 2022 Census, Bangladesh has a population of 165.1 million, and is the eighth-most-populous country in the world, the fifth-most populous country in Asia, and the most densely populated large country in the world, with a headline population density of 1,265 people/km2 . Its total fertility rate (TFR), once among the highest in the world, has experienced a dramatic decline, from 5.5 in 1985, to 3.7 in 1995, all the way down to 2.0 in 2020, which is below the sub-replacement fertility of 2.1; due to the government promoting birth control since the 1980s and increased education attainment of females. The vast majority of Bangladeshis live in rural areas, with only 39% of the population living in urban areas . It has a median age of roughly 28 years, and its population is relatively young, with 26% of the total population aged 14 or younger, and merely 5% aged 65 and above.

Bangladesh is an ethnically and culturally homogeneous society, as Bengalis form 99% of the population. The Adivasi population includes the Chakmas, Marmas, Santhals, Mros, Tanchangyas, Bawms, Tripuris, Khasis, Khumis, Kukis, Garos, and Bisnupriya Manipuris. The Chittagong Hill Tracts region experienced unrest and an insurgency from 1975 to 1997 in an autonomy movement by its indigenous people. Although a peace accord was signed in 1997, the region remains militarised. Urdu-speaking stranded Pakistanis were given citizenship by the Supreme Court in 2008. Bangladesh also hosts over 700,000 Rohingya refugees since 2017, giving it one of the largest refugee populations in the world.

Urban centres

Dhaka is Bangladesh's capital and largest city and is overseen by two city corporations who manage between them the northern and southern part of the city. There are 12 city corporations which hold mayoral elections: Dhaka South, Dhaka North, Chittagong, Comilla, Khulna, Mymensingh, Sylhet, Rajshahi, Barisal, Rangpur, Gazipur and Narayanganj. Mayors are elected for five-year terms. Altogether there are 506 urban centres in Bangladesh among which 43 cities have a population of more than 100,000.

Language

The official and predominant language of Bangladesh is Bengali, which is spoken by more than 98% of the population as their native language. It is among the easternmost branches of the Indo-European language family, and is a part of the Eastern Indo-Aryan languages, which developed between the 10th and 13th centuries. Bengali is described as a dialect continuum where there are various dialects spoken throughout the country. There is a diglossia in which much of the population are able to understand or speak Standard Colloquial Bengali and in their regional dialect, such as Chittagonian, Sylheti and which some linguists consider as separate languages; noted for their Arab-Persian influences.

English plays an important role in Bangladesh's judicial and educational affairs, due to the country's history as part of the British Empire. It is widely spoken and commonly understood, and is taught as a compulsory subject in all schools, colleges and universities; while the English-medium educational system is widely attended. Tribal languages, although increasingly endangered, include the Chakma language, another native Eastern Indo-Aryan language, spoken by the Chakma people. Others include Garo, Meitei, Kokborok and Rakhine. Among the Austroasiatic languages, the most spoken is the Santali language, native to the Santal people. The stranded Pakistanis and some sections of the Old Dhakaites often use Urdu as their native tongue, although the usage of the latter remains highly reproached.

Religion

Bangladesh was constitutionally proclaimed as the first secular state of South Asia in 1972. It grants freedom of religion and claims to be "secular in practise", while establishing Islam as the state religion. The constitution bans religion-based politics and discrimination, and proclaims equal recognition of people adhering to all faiths. Islam is the largest religion across the country, being followed by about 91.1% of the population. The vast majority of Bangladeshi citizens are Bengali Muslims, adhering to Sunni Islam. The country is the third-most populous Muslim-majority state in the world, and has the fourth-largest overall Muslim population.

Hinduism is followed by 7.9% of the population, mainly by the Bengali Hindus, who form the country's second-largest religious group and the third-largest Hindu community globally; after those in India and Nepal. Buddhism is the third-largest religion, at 0.6% of the population. Bangladeshi Buddhists are concentrated among the tribal ethnic groups in the Chittagong Hill Tracts. At the same time, coastal Chittagong is home to many Bengali Buddhists. Christianity is the fourth-largest religion, at 0.3%, followed mainly by a small Bengali Christian minority. While 0.1% practices other religions like Animism and no religion.

Education 

Article (17) of the constitution states that all children shall receive free and compulsory education. Education in Bangladesh is overseen by the Ministry of Education. The Ministry of Primary and Mass Education is responsible for implementing policy for primary education and state-funded schools at a local level. Primary and secondary education is compulsory, and is financed by the state and free of charge in public schools. Bangladesh has a literacy rate of 74.7% percent as of 2019: 77.4% for males and 71.9% for females. The country's educational system is three-tiered and heavily subsidised, with the government operating many schools at the primary, secondary and higher secondary levels and subsidising many private schools. In the tertiary education sector, the Bangladeshi government funds over 45 state universities through the University Grants Commission (UGC), created by Presidential Order 10 in 1973.

The education system is divided into five levels: primary (first to fifth grade), junior secondary (sixth to eighth grade), secondary (ninth and tenth grade), higher secondary (11th and 12th grade), and tertiary. Five years of secondary education (including junior secondary) ends with a Secondary School Certificate (SSC) examination. Since 2009, the Primary Education Closing (PEC) examination has also been introduced. Students who pass the PEC examination proceed to secondary or matriculation training, culminating in the SSC examination. Students who pass the PEC examination proceed to three years of junior secondary education, culminating in the Junior School Certificate (JSC) examination. Students who pass this examination proceed to two years of secondary education, culminating in the SSC examination. Students who pass this examination proceed to two years of higher secondary education, culminating in the Higher Secondary School Certificate (HSC) examination.

Universities in Bangladesh are of three general types: public (government-owned and subsidised), private (privately owned universities) and international (operated and funded by international organisations). The country has 47 public, 105 private and two international universities; Bangladesh National University has the largest enrolment, and the University of Dhaka (established in 1921) is the oldest. University of Chittagong, established in 1966, has the largest campus among all universities in Bangladesh. Medical education is provided by 29 government and private medical colleges. All medical colleges are affiliated with the Ministry of Health and Family Welfare.

Health

Bangladesh, by constitution, guarantees healthcare services as a fundamental right to all of its citizens. The Ministry of Health and Family Welfare is the largest institutional healthcare provider in Bangladesh, and contains two divisions: Health Service Division and Medical Education And Family Welfare Division. However, healthcare facilities in Bangladesh are considered less than adequate, although they have improved as the economy has grown and poverty levels have decreased significantly. Bangladesh faces a severe health workforce crisis, as formally-trained providers make up a short percentage the total health workforce. Significant deficiencies in the treatment practices of village doctors persist, with widespread harmful and inappropriate drug prescribing. Receiving health care from informal providers is encouraged.

Bangladesh's poor healthcare system suffers from severe underfunding from the government. , some 2.48% of total GDP was attributed to healthcare, and domestic general government spending on healthcare was 18.63% of the total budget, while out-of-pocket expenditures made up the vast majority of total budget, totalling 72.68%. Domestic private health expenditure was about 75% of the total healthcare expenditure. , there are only 5.3 doctors per 10,000 people, and about 6 physicians and 3 nurses per 10,000 people, while the number of hospital beds is 8 per 10,000. The overall life expectancy in Bangladesh at birth was 73 years (71 years for males and 75 years for females) , and it has a comparably high infant mortality rate (24 per 1,000 live births) and child mortality rate (29 per 1,000 live births). Maternal mortality remains high, clocking at 173 per 100,000 live births. Bangladesh is a key source market for medical tourism for various countries, mainly India, due to its citizens dissatisfaction and distrust over their own healthcare system.

The main causes of death are coronary artery disease, stroke, and chronic respiratory disease; comprising 62% and 60% of all adult male and female deaths, respectively. Malnutrition is a major and persistent problem in Bangladesh, mainly affecting the rural regions, more than half of the population suffers from it. Severe acute malnutrition affects 450,000 children, while close to 2 million children have moderate acute malnutrition. For children under the age of five, 52% are affected by anaemia, 41% are stunted, 16% are wasted, and 36% are underweight. A quarter of women are underweight and around 15% have short stature, while over half also suffer from anaemia.

Culture

Visual arts and crafts

The recorded history of art in Bangladesh can be traced to the 3rd century BCE, when terracotta sculptures were made in the region. In classical antiquity, a notable sculptural Hindu, Jain and Buddhist art developed in the Pala Empire and the Sena dynasty. Islamic art has evolved since the 14th century. The architecture of the Bengal Sultanate saw a distinct style of domed mosques with complex niche pillars that had no minarets. Mughal Bengal's most celebrated artistic tradition was the weaving of Jamdani motifs on fine muslin, which is now classified by UNESCO as an intangible cultural heritage. Jamdani motifs were similar to Iranian textile art (buta motifs) and Western textile art (paisley). The Jamdani weavers in Dhaka received imperial patronage. Ivory and brass were also widely used in Mughal art. Pottery is widely used in Bengali culture.

The modern art movement in Bangladesh took shape during the 1950s, particularly with the pioneering works of Zainul Abedin. East Bengal developed its own modernist painting and sculpture traditions, which were distinct from the art movements in West Bengal. The Art Institute Dhaka has been an important centre for visual art in the region. Its annual Bengali New Year parade was enlisted as an intangible cultural heritage by UNESCO in 2016.

Modern Bangladesh has produced many of South Asia's leading painters, including SM Sultan, Mohammad Kibria, Shahabuddin Ahmed, Kanak Chanpa Chakma, Kafil Ahmed, Saifuddin Ahmed, Qayyum Chowdhury, Rashid Choudhury, Quamrul Hassan, Rafiqun Nabi and Syed Jahangir, among others. Novera Ahmed and Nitun Kundu were the country's pioneers of modernist sculpture.

In recent times, photography as a medium of art has become popular. Biennial Chobi Mela is considered the largest photography festival in Asia.

Literature

The oldest evidence of writing in Bangladesh is the Mahasthan Brahmi Inscription, which dates back to the 3rd century BCE. In the Gupta Empire, Sanskrit literature thrived in the region. Bengali developed from Sanskrit and Magadhi Prakrit in the 8th to 10th century. Bengali literature is a millennium-old tradition; the Charyapadas are the earliest examples of Bengali poetry. Sufi spiritualism inspired many Bengali Muslim writers. During the Bengal Sultanate, medieval Bengali writers were influenced by Arabic and Persian works. Sultans of Bengal patronized Bengali literature. Examples include the writings of Maladhar Basu, Bipradas Pipilai, Vijay Gupta and Yasoraj Khan. The Chandidas are the notable lyric poets from the early Medieval Age. Syed Alaol was the bard of middle Bengali literature. The Bengal Renaissance shaped modern Bengali literature, including novels, short stories and science fiction. Rabindranath Tagore was the first non-European laureate of the Nobel Prize in Literature and is described as the Bengali Shakespeare. Kazi Nazrul Islam was a revolutionary poet who espoused political rebellion against colonialism and fascism. Begum Rokeya is regarded as the pioneer feminist writer of Bangladesh. Other renaissance icons included Michael Madhusudan Dutt and Sarat Chandra Chattopadhyay.
The writer Syed Mujtaba Ali is noted for his cosmopolitan Bengali worldview. Jasimuddin was a renowned pastoral poet. Shamsur Rahman and Al Mahmud are considered two of the greatest Bengali poets to have emerged in the 20th century. Farrukh Ahmad, Sufia Kamal, Syed Ali Ahsan, Ahsan Habib, Abul Hussain, Shahid Qadri, Fazal Shahabuddin, Abu Zafar Obaidullah, Omar Ali, Al Mujahidi, Syed Shamsul Huq, Nirmalendu Goon, Abid Azad, Hasan Hafizur Rahman and Abdul Hye Sikder are important figures of modern Bangladeshi poetry. Ahmed Sofa is regarded as the most important Bangladeshi intellectual in the post-independence era. Humayun Ahmed was a popular writer of modern Bangladeshi magical realism and science fiction. Notable writers of Bangladeshi fictions include Mir Mosharraf Hossain, Akhteruzzaman Elias, Alauddin Al Azad, Shahidul Zahir, Rashid Karim, Mahmudul Haque, Syed Waliullah, Shahidullah Kaiser, Shawkat Osman, Selina Hossain, Shahed Ali, Razia Khan, Anisul Hoque, and Abdul Mannan Syed.

The annual Ekushey Book Fair and Dhaka Literature Festival, organised by the Bangla Academy, are among the largest literary festivals in South Asia.

Women

Although , several women occupied major political office in Bangladesh. Its women continue to live under a patriarchal social regime where violence is common. Whereas in India and Pakistan women participate less in the workforce as their education increases, the reverse is the case in Bangladesh.

Bengal has a long history of feminist activism dating back to the 19th century. Begum Rokeya and Faizunnessa Chowdhurani played an important role in emancipating Bengali Muslim women from purdah, before the country's division, as well as promoting girls' education. Several women were elected to the Bengal Legislative Assembly in the British Raj. The first women's magazine, Begum, was published in 1948.

In 2008, Bangladeshi female workforce participation stood at 26%. Women dominate blue collar jobs in the Bangladeshi garment industry. Agriculture, social services, healthcare and education are also major occupations for Bangladeshi women, while their employment in white collar positions has steadily increased.

Architecture

The architectural traditions of Bangladesh have a 2,500-year-old heritage. Terracotta architecture is a distinct feature of Bengal. Pre-Islamic Bengali architecture reached its pinnacle in the Pala Empire, when the Pala School of Sculptural Art established grand structures such as the Somapura Mahavihara. Islamic architecture began developing under the Bengal Sultanate, when local terracotta styles influenced medieval mosque construction.

The Sixty Dome Mosque was the largest medieval mosque built in Bangladesh and is a fine example of Turkic-Bengali architecture. The Mughal style replaced indigenous architecture when Bengal became a province of the Mughal Empire and influenced urban housing development. The Kantajew Temple and Dhakeshwari Temple are excellent examples of late medieval Hindu temple architecture. Indo-Saracenic Revival architecture, based on Indo-Islamic styles, flourished during the British period. The zamindar gentry in Bangladesh built numerous Indo-Saracenic palaces and country mansions, such as the Ahsan Manzil, Tajhat Palace, Dighapatia Palace, Puthia Rajbari and Natore Rajbari.

Bengali vernacular architecture is noted for pioneering the bungalow. Bangladeshi villages consist of thatched roofed houses made of natural materials like mud, straw, wood and bamboo. In modern times, village bungalows are increasingly made of tin.

Muzharul Islam was the pioneer of Bangladeshi modern architecture. His varied works set the course of modern architectural practice in the country. Islam brought leading global architects, including Louis Kahn, Richard Neutra, Stanley Tigerman, Paul Rudolph, Robert Boughey and Konstantinos Doxiadis, to work in erstwhile East Pakistan. Louis Kahn was chosen to design the National Parliament Complex in Sher-e-Bangla Nagar. Kahn's monumental designs, combining regional red brick aesthetics, his own concrete and marble brutalism and the use of lakes to represent Bengali geography, are regarded as one of the masterpieces of the 20th century. In more recent times, award-winning architects like Rafiq Azam have set the course of contemporary architecture by adopting influences from the works of Islam and Kahn.

Performing arts

Theatre in Bangladesh includes various forms with a history dating back to the 4th century CE. It includes narrative forms, song and dance forms, supra-personae forms, performances with scroll paintings, puppet theatre and processional forms. The Jatra is the most popular form of Bengali folk theatre.
The dance traditions of Bangladesh include indigenous tribal and Bengali dance forms, as well as classical Indian dances, including the Kathak, Odissi and Manipuri dances.

The music of Bangladesh features the Baul mystical tradition, listed by UNESCO as a Masterpiece of Intangible Cultural Heritage. Fakir Lalon Shah popularised Baul music in the country in the 18th century and it has since been one of the most popular music genera in the country since then. Most modern Bauls are devoted to Lalon Shah. Numerous lyric-based musical traditions, varying from one region to the next, exist, including Gombhira, Bhatiali and Bhawaiya. Folk music is accompanied by a one-stringed instrument known as the ektara. Other instruments include the dotara, dhol, flute, and tabla. Bengali classical music includes Tagore songs and Nazrul Sangeet. Bangladesh has a rich tradition of Indian classical music, which uses instruments like the sitar, tabla, sarod and santoor. Sabina Yasmin and Runa Laila were considered the leading playback singers in the 1990s, while musicians such as Ayub Bachchu and James are credited with popularising rock music in Bangladesh.

Textiles

The Nakshi Kantha is a centuries-old embroidery tradition for quilts, said to be indigenous to eastern Bengal (i.e. Bangladesh). The sari is the national dress for Bangladeshi women. Mughal Dhaka was renowned for producing the finest Muslin saris, as well as the famed Dhakai and Jamdani, the weaving of which is listed by UNESCO as one of the masterpieces of humanity's intangible cultural heritage. Bangladesh also produces the Rajshahi silk. The shalwar kameez is also widely worn by Bangladeshi women. In urban areas, some women can be seen in western clothing. The kurta and sherwani are the national dress of Bangladeshi men; the lungi and dhoti are worn by them in informal settings. Aside from ethnic wear, domestically tailored suits and neckties are customarily worn by the country's men in offices, in schools and at social events.

The handloom industry supplies 60–65% of the country's clothing demand. The Bengali ethnic fashion industry has flourished in the changing environment of the fashion world. The retailer Aarong is one of South Asia's most successful ethnic wear brands. The development of the Bangladesh textile industry, which supplies leading international brands, has promoted the local production and retail of modern Western attire. The country now has a number of expanding local brands like Westecs and Yellow. Bangladesh is the world's second-largest garments exporter. Among Bangladesh's fashion designers, Bibi Russell has received international acclaim for her "Fashion for Development" shows.

Cuisine

Bangladeshi cuisine, formed by its geographic location and climate, is rich and varied; sharing its culinary heritage with the neighbouring Indian state of West Bengal. White rice is the staple, and along with fish, forms the culinary base. Varieties of leaf vegetables, potatoes, gourds and lentils (dal) also play an important role. Curries of beef, mutton, chicken and duck are commonly consumed, along with multiple types of bhortas, bhajis and torkaris. Mughal-influenced dishes include kormas, kalias, biryanis, pulaos, teharis and khichuris. Among the various spices, turmeric, fenugreek, nigella, coriander, anise, cardamom and chili powder are widely used; a famous spice mix is the panch phoron. Among the condiments and herbs used, red onions, green chillies, garlic, ginger, cilantro, and mint stand out. Coconut milk, mustard paste, mustard seeds, mustard oil, ghee, achars and chutneys are also widely used in the cuisine.

Fish is the main source of protein, owing to the country's riverine geography, and it is often enjoyed with its roe. The hilsa is the national fish and immensely popular, a famous dish is shorshe ilish. Rohu, pangas, and tilapia are also highly consumed. Lobsters, shrimps and dried fish (shutki) are also widely consumed, with the chingri malai curry being a famous shrimp dish. In Chittagong, famous dishes include kala bhuna and mezban; the latter being a traditionally popular feast, featuring the serving of mezbani gosht, a hot and spicy beef curry. In Sylhet, the shatkora lemons are used to marinate dishes, a notable one is beef hatkora. Among the tribal communities in the Chittagong Hill Tracts, cooking with bamboo shoots is popular. Khulna is renowned for using chui jhal (piper chaba) in its meat-based dishes.

Bangladesh has a vast spread of desserts, including distinctive sweets such as the rôshogolla,  roshmalai, chomchom, sondesh, mishti doi and kalojaam, and jilapi. Pithas are traditional boiled desserts made with rice or fruits. Halwa is served during religious festivities. Ruti, naan, paratha, luchi and bakarkhani are the main local breads. Hot milk tea is the most commonly consumed beverage in the country, being the centre of addas. Borhani is a popular traditionally consumed beverage. Kebabs are widely popular, particularly seekh kebab, chapli kebab, shami kebab, chicken tikka and shashlik, along with various types of chaaps. Popular street foods include chotpoti, jhal muri and fuchka. The large Bangladeshi diaspora dominate the South Asian restaurant industry in many Western countries, particularly in the United Kingdom.

Festivals

Pahela Baishakh, the Bengali new year, is the major festival of Bengali culture and sees widespread festivities. Of the major holidays celebrated in Bangladesh, only Pahela Baishakh comes without any pre-existing expectations (specific religious identity, culture of gift-giving, etc.) and has become an occasion for celebrating the simpler, rural roots of the Bengal. Other cultural festivals include Nabonno and Poush Parbon, Bengali harvest festivals.

The Muslim festivals of Eid al-Fitr, Eid al-Adha, Milad un Nabi, Muharram, Chand Raat, Shab-e-Barat; the Hindu festivals of Durga Puja, Janmashtami and Rath Yatra; the Buddhist festival of Buddha Purnima, which marks the birth of Gautama Buddha, and the Christian festival of Christmas are national holidays in Bangladesh and see the most widespread celebrations in the country. The two Eids are celebrated with a long streak of public holidays and give the city-dwellers opportunity to celebrate the festivals with their families outside the city.

Alongside are national days like the remembrance of 21 February 1952 Language Movement Day (declared as International Mother Language Day by UNESCO in 1999), Independence Day and Victory Day. On Language Movement Day, people congregate at the Shaheed Minar in Dhaka to remember the national heroes of the Bengali Language Movement. Similar gatherings are observed at the National Martyrs' Memorial on Independence Day and Victory Day to remember the national heroes of the Bangladesh Liberation War. These occasions are celebrated with public ceremonies, parades, rallies by citizens, political speeches, fairs, concerts, and various other public and private events, celebrating the history and traditions of Bangladesh. TV and radio stations broadcast special programmes and patriotic songs. Many schools and colleges organise fairs, festivals, and concerts that draw the participation of citizens from all levels of Bangladeshi society.

Sports

In rural Bangladesh, several traditional indigenous sports such as Kabaddi, Boli Khela, Lathi Khela and Nouka Baich remain fairly popular. While Kabaddi is the national sport, cricket is the most popular sport in the country. The national cricket team participated in their first Cricket World Cup in 1999 and the following year was granted Test cricket status. Bangladesh reached the quarter-final of the 2015 Cricket World Cup, the semi-final of the 2017 ICC Champions Trophy and they reached the final of the Asia Cup 3 times – in 2012, 2016 and 2018. In February 2020, the Bangladesh youth national cricket team won the men's Under-19 Cricket World Cup, held in South Africa. This was Bangladesh's first World Cup victory. Women's sports saw significant progress in the 2010s decade in Bangladesh. In 2018, the Bangladesh women's national cricket team won the 2018 Women's Twenty20 Asia Cup defeating India women's national cricket team in the final.

Football is a major sport in Bangladesh, and is governed by the Bangladesh Football Federation (BFF). Although football was seen as the most popular sport in the country before the 21st century, success in cricket has overshadowed its past popularity. The first instance of a national football team was the emergence of the Shadhin Bangla Football Team that toured throughout India playing a total of 16 friendly matches to raise international awareness about the Bangladesh Liberation War, in 1971. After independence, the national football team also participated in the AFC Asian Cup (1980), becoming only the second South Asian team to do so. Bangladesh's most notable achievements in football include their 2003 SAFF Championship and 1999 South Asian Games triumph. The Bangladesh women's national football team has also registered some success at regional level, especially the Under-15 and Under-18 teams. In 2022, the women's team created history by winning the 2022 SAFF Women's Championship.

Bangladesh archers Ety Khatun and Roman Sana won several gold medals winning all the 10 archery events (both individual, and team events) in the 2019 South Asian Games. The National Sports Council regulates 42 sporting federations. Athletics, swimming, archery, boxing, volleyball, weight-lifting and wrestling and different forms of martial arts remain popular. Chess is very popular in Bangladesh. Bangladesh has five grandmasters in chess. Among them, Niaz Murshed was the first grandmaster in South Asia. In 2010, mountain climber Musa Ibrahim became the first Bangladeshi climber to conquer Mount Everest. Wasfia Nazreen is the first Bangladeshi climber to climb the Seven Summits.

Bangladesh hosts a number of international tournaments. Bangabandhu Cup is an international football tournament hosted in the country. Bangladesh hosted the South Asian Games several times. In 2011, Bangladesh co-hosted the ICC Cricket World Cup 2011 with India and Sri Lanka. Bangladesh solely hosted the 2014 ICC World Twenty20 championship. Bangladesh hosted the Asia Cup Cricket Tournament in 2000, 2012, 2014 and 2016.

Media and cinema

The Bangladeshi press is diverse, outspoken and privately owned. Over 200 newspapers are published in the country. Bangladesh Betar is the state-run radio service. The British Broadcasting Corporation operates the popular BBC Bangla news and current affairs service. Bengali broadcasts from Voice of America are also very popular. Bangladesh Television (BTV) is a state-owned television network. More than 20 privately owned television networks, including several news channels. Freedom of the media remains a major concern due to government attempts at censorship and the harassment of journalists.

The cinema of Bangladesh dates back to 1898 when films began screening at the Crown Theatre in Dhaka. The first bioscope on the subcontinent was established in Dhaka that year. The Dhaka Nawab Family patronised the production of several silent films in the 1920s and 30s. In 1931, the East Bengal Cinematograph Society released the first full-length feature film in Bangladesh, titled the Last Kiss. The first feature film in East Pakistan, Mukh O Mukhosh, was released in 1956. During the 1960s, 25–30 films were produced annually in Dhaka. By the 2000s, Bangladesh produced 80–100 films a year. While the Bangladeshi film industry has achieved limited commercial success, the country has produced notable independent filmmakers. Zahir Raihan was a prominent documentary-maker assassinated in 1971. The late Tareque Masud is regarded as one of Bangladesh's outstanding directors for his critically acclaimed films on social issues. Masud was honoured by FIPRESCI at the 2002 Cannes Film Festival for his film The Clay Bird. Tanvir Mokammel, Mostofa Sarwar Farooki, Humayun Ahmed, Alamgir Kabir, and Chashi Nazrul Islam are some of the prominent directors of Bangladeshi cinema. Bangladesh has a very active film society culture. It started in 1963 in Dhaka. Now around 40 Film Societies are active all over Bangladesh. Federation of Film Societies of Bangladesh is the parent organisation of the film society movement of Bangladesh. Active film societies include the Rainbow Film Society, Children's Film Society, Moviyana Film Society and Dhaka University Film Society.

Museums and libraries

The Varendra Research Museum is the oldest museum in Bangladesh. It houses important collections from both the pre-Islamic and Islamic periods, including the sculptures of the Pala-Sena School of Art and the Indus Valley civilisation, and Sanskrit, Arabic, and Persian manuscripts and inscriptions. The Ahsan Manzil, the former residence of the Nawab of Dhaka, is a national museum housing collections from the British Raj. It was the site of the founding conference of the All India Muslim League and hosted many British Viceroys in Dhaka.

The Tajhat Palace Museum preserves artefacts of the rich cultural heritage of North Bengal, including Hindu-Buddhist sculptures and Islamic manuscripts. The Mymensingh Museum houses the personal antique collections of Bengali aristocrats in central Bengal. The Ethnological Museum of Chittagong showcases the lifestyle of various tribes in Bangladesh. The Bangladesh National Museum is located in Ramna, Dhaka and has a rich collection of antiquities. The Liberation War Museum documents the Bangladeshi struggle for independence and the 1971 genocide.

In ancient times, manuscripts were written on palm leaves, tree barks, parchment vellum and terracotta plates and preserved at monasteries known as viharas. The Hussain Shahi dynasty established royal libraries during the Bengal Sultanate. Libraries were established in each district of Bengal by the zamindar gentry during the Bengal Renaissance in the 19th century. The trend of establishing libraries continued until the beginning of World War II. In 1854, four major public libraries were opened, including the Bogra Woodburn Library, the Rangpur Public Library, the Jessore Institute Public Library and the Barisal Public Library.

The Northbrook Hall Public Library was established in Dhaka in 1882 in honour of Lord Northbrook, the Governor-General. Other libraries established in the British period included the Victoria Public Library, Natore (1901), the Sirajganj Public Library (1882), the Rajshahi Public Library (1884), the Comilla Birchandra Library (1885), the Shah Makhdum Institute Public Library, Rajshahi (1891), the Noakhali Town Hall Public Library (1896), the Prize Memorial Library, Sylhet (1897), the Chittagong Municipality Public Library (1904) and the Varendra Research Library (1910). The Great Bengal Library Association was formed in 1925. The Central Public Library of Dhaka was established in 1959. The National Library of Bangladesh was established in 1972. The World Literature Centre, founded by Ramon Magsaysay Award winner Abdullah Abu Sayeed, is noted for operating numerous mobile libraries across Bangladesh and was awarded the UNESCO Jon, Amos Comenius Medal.

See also

 Index of Bangladesh-related articles
 Outline of Bangladesh

References

Cited sources

Further reading

 Ahmed, Nizam. The Parliament of Bangladesh (Routledge, 2018).
 
 
 Baxter, Craig. Bangladesh: From a nation to a state (Routledge, 2018).
 
 
 
 
 Hasnat, GN Tanjina, Md Alamgir Kabir, and Md Akhter Hossain. "Major environmental issues and problems of South Asia, particularly Bangladesh." Handbook of environmental materials management (2018): 1-40. online
 Iftekhar Iqbal (2010) The Bengal Delta: Ecology, State and Social Change, 1840–1943 (Palgrave Macmillan) 
 Islam, Saiful, and Md Ziaur Rahman Khan. "A review of the energy sector of Bangladesh." Energy Procedia 110 (2017): 611–618. online
 Jannuzi, F. Tomasson, and James T. Peach. The agrarian structure of Bangladesh: An impediment to development (Routledge, 2019).
 
 
 M. Mufakharul Islam (edited) (2004) Socio-Economic History of Bangladesh: essays in memory of Professor Shafiqur Rahman, 1st Edition, Asiatic Society of Bangladesh, 
 M. Mufakharul Islam (2007) Bengal Agriculture 1920–1946: A Quantitative Study (Cambridge University Press), 
 Prodhan, Mohit. "The educational system in Bangladesh and scope for improvement." Journal of International Social Issues 4.1 (2016): 11–23. online
 
 
 Riaz, Ali. Bangladesh: A political history since independence (Bloomsbury Publishing, 2016).
 
 
 
 Shelley, Israt J., et al. "Rice cultivation in Bangladesh: present scenario, problems, and prospects." Journal of International Cooperation for Agricultural Development 14.4 (2016): 20–29. online
 Sirajul Islam (edited) (1997) History of Bangladesh 1704–1971(Three Volumes: Vol 1: Political History, Vol 2: Economic History Vol 3: Social and Cultural History), 2nd Edition (Revised New Edition), The Asiatic Society of Bangladesh,  
 Sirajul Islam (Chief Editor) (2003) Banglapedia: A National Encyclopedia of Bangladesh.(10 Vols. Set), (written by 1300 scholars & 22 editors) The Asiatic Society of Bangladesh, 
 
 
 
 Van Schendel, Willem. A history of Bangladesh (Cambridge University Press, 2020).

External links

Government
 
 Official Site of Bangladesh Investment Development Authority

General information
 Bangladesh. The World Factbook. Central Intelligence Agency.
 
 Bangladesh from the BBC News
 Bangladesh from UCB Libraries GovPubs
 
 
 Key Development Forecasts for Bangladesh from International Futures

 
Bengal
Bengali-speaking countries and territories
Republics in the Commonwealth of Nations
Developing 8 Countries member states
Former British colonies and protectorates in Asia
Least developed countries
Member states of the Commonwealth of Nations
Member states of the Organisation of Islamic Cooperation
Member states of the South Asian Association for Regional Cooperation
Member states of the United Nations
South Asian countries
States and territories established in 1971
1971 establishments in Asia
Countries in Asia
Geographical articles missing image alternative text